Jubzhang Jubzhang (born 7 May 1971) is a Bhutanese archer. He competed at the 1992, 1996 and 2000 Summer Olympics in the men's individual event. In 2000, he "bowed out" in his opening match to Nico Hendrickx. Although experienced at Olympic archery his own nation's different style of play may have been a factor. He now owns a bowtech shop, dealing with all the kits related to archery. In Bhutan the bow is made of bamboo, no animals are killed to make the arrows because of their Buddhist beliefs, they shoot from further away, the competition goes on for four days, and archery events involve drinking large quantities of alcohol.

References

External links
 

1971 births
Living people
Bhutanese male archers
Olympic archers of Bhutan
Archers at the 1992 Summer Olympics
Archers at the 1996 Summer Olympics
Archers at the 2000 Summer Olympics
Asian Games competitors for Bhutan
Archers at the 1994 Asian Games
Archers at the 1998 Asian Games